The Lithuania national under-17 football team or Lithuania U-17 represents Lithuania in association football at the under-17 youth level, and is controlled by the Lithuanian Football Federation.

The team is for Lithuanian players aged 17 or under at the start of a two-year UEFA European Under-17 Championship cycle, so players appearing for the team can actually be up to 19 years of age. The U-17 team is a feeder to the under-19 and under-21 teams.

Competition history
Prior to Lithuania's independence in 1991, Lithuanian players were eligible for selection to the Soviet Union U-16 team. Following the dissolution of the Soviet Union, the Lithuanian Football Federation was admitted to UEFA as a full member in 1992, and the Lithuania U-16 team played their first competitive matches in the first phase of the qualifying tournament for the 1994 European U-16 Championship. The team's competitive debut came on 30 August 1993 against Wales U-16 and they finished their first qualifying campaign as 3rd out of 3 teams, behind Wales and Iceland.

Although the team has continued to participate in every under-16 and under-17 European Championship qualifying cycle since 1994, the team has never qualified for any of the tournaments.

European Championship

Under-16 format

Under-17 format

Recent results

Past results

Current squad
 The following players were called up for the 2023 UEFA European Under-17 Championship qualification matches.
 Match dates: 25-31 October 2022
 Opposition: ,  and 
Caps and goals correct as of: 15 September 2022, after the match against

Managers
 Rolandas Džiaukštas - 2021
 Robert Kilin - 2022
 Andrius Velička - 2023

See also
 Lithuania national football team
 Lithuania national under-21 football team
 Lithuania national under-19 football team

References

External links
 Lithuania under-17s at UEFA.com

European national under-17 association football teams
under-17